Yasmine Chouikh (born 1982) is an Algerian journalist and film director. Her first film, the romantic drama Until The End Of Time, won the Best First Feature award at Panafrican Film and Television Festival of Ouagadougou (FESPACO) in 2019.

Life
Chouikh was born in 1982 in Algiers, the daughter of the film director and screenwriter Yamina Bachir and the actor-director Mohamed Chouikh. She graduated in psychology and education. She is the artistic director of the Taghit International Short Film Festival.

Films
 El bab (The Door) (2006, short film)
 El Djinn (2010, short film)
 Until The End of Time (2017)

References

1982 births
Living people
Algerian journalists
Algerian film directors
Algerian women film directors
21st-century Algerian people